Ge Fei (born 1964) is the pen-name for Liu Yong, a Chinese novelist who is considered one of the preeminent experimental writers during the late 1980s and early 1990s.

Biography
Ge Fei was born in Dantu, Jiangsu, in 1964. He graduated from East China Normal University in 1985. He received his PhD in 2000.

Works 
His most prominent work is the novel Peach Blossom Paradise (人面桃花, Renmian Taohua, 2004), which explores the concept of utopia, and is laden with classical allusions. The English translation was selected as a finalist for the National Book Award for Translated Literature in 2021. It is the first book of his Jiangnan Trilogy, of which the second book, My Dream of the Mountain and River (山河入梦 Shanhe Rumeng), was published in 2007. The third is Spring Ends in Jiangnan, published in 2011.

The title of Renmian Taohua is taken from a classical work, and has also been used by the director Du Haibin for his documentary on a gay club in Chengdu (2005). The English name for the film, Beautiful Men, is not a direct translation.

The novellas The Invisibility Cloak and Flock of Brown Birds were the first works by Ge Fei to become available in English. They appeared in 2016 in translations by Canaan Morse and Poppy Toland respectively.  An English translation of Peach Blossom Paradise was published in 2020.

Bibliography 

 《追忆乌攸先生》 [Zhuiyi Wu You Xiansheng] (1986).
 《陷阱》 [Xian Jing] (1987).
 《迷舟》 [Mizhou] (1987).
 《褐色鸟群》 [Hese Niao Qun] (1988). Flock of Brown Birds, trans. Poppy Toland (Penguin, 2016).
 《大年》 [Danian] (1988).
 《青黄》 [Qinghuang] (1988).
 《敌人》 [Diren] (1993).
 《锦瑟》 [Jinse] (1993).
 《相遇》 [Xiangyu] (1993).
 《欲望的旗帜》 [Yuwang de qizhi] (1996).
 《人面桃花》 [Renmian Taohua] (2004). Peach Blossom Paradise, trans. Canaan Morse (New York Review Books, 2020).
 《山河入梦》 [Shan He Rumeng] (2007). My Dream of the Mountain and River.
 《春尽江南》 [Chun Jin Jiangnan] (2011). Spring Ends in Jiangnan.
 《隐身衣》 [Yinshen Yi] (2012). The Invisibility Cloak, trans. Canaan Morse (New York Review Books, 2016).

References

External links
Ge Fei home page at Sohu.com 

1964 births
Living people
Writers from Zhenjiang
East China Normal University alumni
Chinese male novelists
Chinese male short story writers
Educators from Zhenjiang
Mao Dun Literature Prize laureates
People's Republic of China short story writers
Short story writers from Jiangsu